Kolkata Municipal Corporation (abbreviated KMC; also Calcutta Municipal Corporation) is  the local government of the Indian city of Kolkata, the state capital of West Bengal. Its motto, Purosri Bibardhan, is inscribed on its emblem in Bengali script.

Geography

Department

Structure
Kolkata Municipal Corporation was established in 1876. Under the guidance of the first Minister of Local Self-Government in Bengal, Sir Surendranath Banerjee, the Calcutta Municipal Act of 1923 made provision for the enfranchisement of women and the election of a Mayor of Kolkata annually. Deshbandhu Chittaranjan Das was the first Mayor of Kolkata Municipal Corporation with Subhas Chandra Bose as his Chief Executive Officer. Later mayors include Deshapriya Jatindra Mohan Sengupta, Subhas Chandra Bose, Bidhan Chandra Roy, Nalini Ranjan Sarkar, Abul Kasem Fazlul Haque, and for the 2010–2015 and 2015–2018 term, Sovan Chatterjee.

The city is divided into 144 administrative wards that are grouped into 16 boroughs. Each of these wards elects a councillor to the KMC. Each borough has a committee consisting of the councillors elected from the respective wards of the boroughs. The Corporation, through the borough committees, maintains government-aided schools, hospitals and municipal markets and partakes in urban planning and road maintenance.<ref
name=Metropolis></ref> The corporation as the apex body discharges its function through the Mayor-in-Council, consisting of a mayor, assisted by a deputy mayor, and ten other elected members of the KMC. The mayor is responsible for the overall functioning of the KMC and has a tenure of five years. At present, the All India Trinamool Congress holds the power in the KMC.

Budget

Criticism
Recently the KMC has faced a lot of criticism for legalising unauthorized construction largely responsible for a number of deaths because of fire. This was also responsible of the unplanned growth in the city.

The Sheriff of Kolkata and The KMDA
The city also has an apolitical titular post, that of the Sheriff of Kolkata. The Sheriff presides over various city-related functions and conferences. Another ancillary civic body is the Kolkata Metropolitan Development Authority (KMDA) responsible for the statutory planning and development of the Kolkata Metropolitan Area (KMA). The KMA includes a large suburban hinterland around the urban centres of Kolkata.

Area of jurisdiction

The jurisdiction of the KMC covers the area covered by the Kolkata Police (which in turn includes the area of Kolkata District / KMC)

In 2011, it was announced that Kolkata Police and Kolkata Municipal Corporation area will be coterminous.

Kolkata Postal District however extends right up to Barrackpur in the North, Barasat in the North-East, Rajarhat in the East, up to Baruipur in South-East and Pailan in South and up to Pujali in South-West. The Postal code in this entire area starts with 700, indicating Postal Sorting Division of Kolkata. Thus Kolkata Postal Division is much bigger than the area of KMC (Kolkata District) and Kolkata Police.

Services
The KMC is responsible for administering and providing basic infrastructure to the city.
 Water purification and supply
 Sewage treatment and disposal
 Garbage disposal and street cleanliness
 Food Inspection:Through KMC Food Inspectors
 Solid waste management
 Building and maintenance of roads, streets and flyovers.
 Street lighting
 Maintenance of parks and open spaces
 Cemeteries and Crematoriums
 Registering of births and deaths
 Conservation of heritage sites
 Disease control, including immunisation
 Public municipal schools etc.
Control Room of Kolkata Municipal Corporation can be contacted at (033) 2286-1212.

References

External links

 
Municipal corporations in West Bengal
Organisations based in Kolkata
Buildings and structures in Kolkata
1876 establishments in British India
Government of Kolkata